Peloropeodes is a genus of flies in the family Dolichopodidae.

Species

 Peloropeodes acuticornis (Oldenberg, 1916)
 Peloropeodes aldrichi Robinson, 1970
 Peloropeodes apicales Harmston & Knowlton, 1946
 Peloropeodes bicolor (Van Duzee, 1926)
 Peloropeodes brevis (Van Duzee, 1926)
 Peloropeodes comorensis Grichanov, 2000
 Peloropeodes cornutus (Van Duzee, 1926)
 Peloropeodes costaericae (Parent, 1928)
 Peloropeodes coxalis (Aldrich, 1901)
 Peloropeodes debilis Robinson, 1975
 Peloropeodes decembris Grichanov, 2000
 Peloropeodes discolor Robinson, 1964
 Peloropeodes dominicensis Robinson, 1975
 Peloropeodes exiguus (Van Duzee, 1933)
 Peloropeodes falco (Aldrich, 1896)
 Peloropeodes frater (Aldrich, 1902)
 Peloropeodes fuscipes (Van Duzee, 1926)
 Peloropeodes genitalis (Parent, 1931)
 Peloropeodes leigongshanensis Wei & Yang, 2007
 Peloropeodes madagascariensis (Dyte & Smith, 1980)
 Peloropeodes magnicornis Harmston & Rapp, 1968
 Peloropeodes matilei Grichanov, 2000
 Peloropeodes meridionalis (Parent, 1928)
 Peloropeodes niger (Curran, 1926)
 Peloropeodes ornatipes (Van Duzee, 1930)
 †Peloropeodes paleomexicana Bickel & Kraemer, 2016
 Peloropeodes pygidus Harmston & Rapp, 1968
 Peloropeodes salax Wheeler, 1890
 Peloropeodes similis (Aldrich, 1896)
 Peloropeodes spinitarsis (Botosaneanu & Vaillant, 1973)
 Peloropeodes tsacasi Grichanov, 2000

References 

 European species on Fauna Europaea
 Nearctic

Dolichopodidae genera
Peloropeodinae
Brachyceran flies of Europe
Taxa named by William Morton Wheeler
Diptera of North America
Diptera of Africa